

The Pickford Center for Motion Picture Study 

The Pickford Center for Motion Picture Study is one of three Los Angeles-area facilities of the Academy of Motion Picture Arts and Sciences, located at 1313 Vine Street in central Hollywood. Precisely situated in the heart of Hollywood, the building site is endowed with terrific history of Hollywood. It is the oldest surviving structure in Hollywood that was designed specifically with television in mind. In addition to the 286-seat Linwood Dunn Theater, where numerous public events are presented throughout the year, the building houses several Academy departments, including the Academy Film Archive, the Science and Technology Council, and the Grants and Nicholl Fellowship programs.

History 
Although the Academy Film Archive was not officially established until 1991, the Academy started storing film prints and archival papers soon after the first Oscars ceremony in 1929, when members began donating materials to the organization. In 1948, a committee of Academy members launched a campaign to acquire all past Oscar-winning and nominated–films, along with many others. In 1994, this officially became the rule at the Academy, with all films stored at the Archive.

Originally located at the Margaret Herrick Library, the Archive moved to Vine Street in 2002 when the Pickford Center for Motion Picture Study opened. The building was constructed in 1948 as a radio and television studio and is the oldest surviving studio building in Los Angeles. First called the Don Lee Mutual Broadcasting Building and originally dedicated on August 18, 1948, as studios for the Mutual-Don Lee Broadcasting System, it was owned by CBS and then by ABC, and it was used for taping series such as The Dating Game, The Newlywed Game, and Barney Miller, among others.  

After it was acquired by the Academy in 2000 and remodeled, the building was renamed in 2002 after Mary Pickford, a founding member of the Academy. The facility’s upgrades included constructing temperature-controlled storage spaces and a state-of-the-art fire suppression system. The renovations also included the addition of the 286-seat Linwood Dunn Theater, named after a visual effects pioneer, to accommodate public programming and screenings of Award-eligible films for Academy members. Additionally, the building houses the offices of several Academy departments, including those responsible for the Academy’s larger public programming efforts, the Student Academy Awards, the Nicholl Screenwriting Fellowship, and the Academy Gold internship program.

Present 
Today, the Pickford Center for Motion Picture Study is the home of the Academy of Motion Picture Arts and Sciences Film Archive, which holds over 230,000 items, making it one of the most diverse and extensive motion picture collections in the world. The Archive maintains all Academy Award–winning films in the Best Picture and Documentary categories as well as many other Oscar-nominated films across categories. It also houses the personal collections of filmmakers such as Tacita Dean, Cecil B. DeMille, Barbara Hammer, Alfred Hitchcock, Jim Jarmusch, Penelope Spheeris, George Stevens, Gus Van Sant, and Fred Zinnemann. 

As one of the Academy’s research and preservation arms, the Pickford also plays an important role in the pre-production of every Academy Awards ceremony.

References

External links
 Academy of Motion Picture Arts and Sciences

Cinema museums in California
Museums in Los Angeles
Academy of Motion Picture Arts and Sciences
Mary Pickford
Buildings and structures in Hollywood, Los Angeles
Cinema of Southern California
2002 establishments in California
2002 establishments in the United States